Widom may refer to:

 Benjamin Widom (born 1927), chemist
 Harold Widom (born 1932–2021), mathematician, brother of Benjamin
 Jennifer Widom, computer scientist
 Todd Widom (born 1983), tennis player

See also
 Tracy–Widom distribution, in statistics
 Widom insertion method, in thermodynamics
 Widom scaling, hypothesis in statistical mechanics